The Luis A. Ferré Performing Arts Center (Centro de Bellas Artes Luis A. Ferré in Spanish) is a multi-use performance centre located in the barrio of Santurce in San Juan, Puerto Rico. It features three main concert and theater halls for plays, ballet, operas and concerts. It was renamed in 1994 after the late Puerto Rican philanthropist, politician and Governor of Puerto Rico, Luis A. Ferré.

The Center opened on April 9, 1981 under the administration of Governor Carlos Romero Barceló after ten years of planning, project financing, and construction. Since then, it has become the most important performing arts venue in the Puerto Rican capital, presenting the highest level of commercial theater in Puerto Rico along with ballets and operas, and also hosting artists such as Plácido Domingo and Menudo. The center is home to the Puerto Rico Symphony Orchestra and the annual Casals Festival.

In January 2019, Lin-Manuel Miranda’s musical Hamilton began its third touring production at the venue, with Miranda reprising the titular role of Founding Father and Secretary of Treasury, Alexander Hamilton, with higher praise than his original run on Broadway. Miranda returned to the venue after nine years since he reprised the role of Usnavi exclusively in San Juan during the North American touring production of In the Heights, which he also wrote.

Facilities
The Center features four main concert and theater halls, two eateries and a central outdoor plaza, each with its own unique features:

 Antonio Paoli Festival Hall – Dedicated to a Puerto Rican opera singer, it is the largest hall of the center. Seating is between 1,875 and 1,945, and features two stories with VIP balconies, world-class acoustic system, and a  stage perfect for scenic musical performances including, operas, ballet, popular music shows, and symphonic concerts.
 René Marqués Theater Hall – Dedicated to one of Puerto Rico's most famous playwrights and essayists, this hall seats between 748 and 781 guests and with a stage measuring 42 by 40 feet, it is specially designed for plays and musical performances.
 Carlos Marichal Performance Hall – dedicated to a respected Puerto Rican set and costume designer, the hall features seating for 210 guests in an intimate arena-styled theater.

  Sala Sinfónica Pablo Casals – symphony hall dedicated to the Spanish Catalan cellist and conductor best remembered for the recording the Bach Cello Suites he made from 1936 to 1939. The $34 million building, designed by Rodolfo Fernandez and Acentech Incorporated's Studio A, seats 1,300 and serves as the new home of the Puerto Rico Symphony Orchestra.
 Juan Morel Campos Plaza, dedicated to the Puerto Rican composer of danzas is located right in front of the center's main entrance, it is a large open plaza featuring a pair of sculptures called The Muses and the Las Tablas Restaurant, and is available for outdoor activities and presentations for 800 guests.
 Sylvia Rexach Theater Café – Designed to be a fourth, but smaller, concert hall, the Café opened in 1988 and offers a relaxed nightclub theme for up to 200 guests with a small stage for intimate performances. A xylographic mural by famed local artist Antonio Martorell decorates its walls and grants homage to Sylvia Rexach, the famous Puerto Rican bolero singer and composer.
 Las Tablas Restaurant (formerly the Arts Pavilion) – is a restaurant within the Juan Morel Campos Plaza and features an award-winning architectural design. The restaurant, whose theme literally embodies the phrase The Beauty of the Caribbean, is owned by international pop star Luis Fonsi and local music and concert producer Tony Mojena. Its menu, developed by Giovanna Huyke, is built around the theme the taste of music, and consists mostly of local traditional foods prepared by its in-house chef Alexis Bartolomei.

Surrounding art
The center is surrounded by various art expositions, including murals, paintings, and sculptures. The two largest halls feature art expositions which distinguishes each one:

 In the Antonio Paoli Festival Hall's second floor, a  mural titled La Plena by Rafael Tufiño is on display and represents twelve famous Puerto Rican plenas by local songwriter Manuel “Canario” Jiménez: Cortaron an Elena; Temporal; El Perro de San Jerónimo; Josefina; Santa María; Tintorera del Mar; Fuego, Fuego, Fuego; Monchín del Alma; Cuando las Mujeres; Tanta Vanidad; Lola; and El Diablo Colorao. The mural was created 30 years before the opening of the Center between 1952 and 1954. It was moved to its current place in 1987 after a three-year restoration project by Anton Konrad.
 In the René Marqués Hall, a  stained glass exposition titled Form and Tropical Crystals by local artist Luis Hernández Cruz illuminates its lobby with 5,700 multi-colored pieces of crystal arranged to showcase themes related to the sea, the forest, the sky and the overall tropical ambiance.

Near the entrance of the center, various expositions greet guests and visitors, including a  aluminum sculpture by Luis Torruella titled Melodic Reflection. However, the main art theme of the center's entrance are The Muses. These are two separate works of art, one being an assortment of  bronze female sculptures along the Juan Morel Campos Plaza,  by Annex Burgos; and the second being a large mural at the center's façade (pictured above), made from a mixture concrete and crystal stones and designed by Augusto Marín. Each muse represents the different arts and cultures which the Center embraces, including local and classical music, theater, literature, dance, films, architecture, sculptures, and painting.

Location
Located along the Ponce de Leon Avenue in the Santurce section of San Juan, the center is located near various retail shops and residential buildings, which produce a vibrant atmosphere around the center both day and night. It has an underground parking garage offering 483 spaces for guests, although adjacent office buildings provide additional spaces.

References

External links

 Official site 

Government-owned corporations of Puerto Rico
Performing arts centers in Puerto Rico
Buildings and structures in San Juan, Puerto Rico
1981 establishments in Puerto Rico
Tourist attractions in San Juan, Puerto Rico
Opera houses in Puerto Rico
Concert halls in Puerto Rico